The first encirclement campaign against the Shaanxi–Gansu Soviet was an encirclement campaign launched by the Chinese Nationalist Government that was intended to destroy the communist Shaanxi–Gansu Soviet and its Chinese Red Army in the local region.  It was responded by the Communists' first counter-encirclement campaign at Shaanxi–Gansu Soviet, also called by the communists as the first counter-encirclement campaign at Shaanxi–Gansu Revolutionary Base, in which the local Chinese Red Army successfully defended their soviet republic in Shaanxi and Gansu provinces against the Nationalist attacks from March 1934 to 26 August 1934.

Prelude
In February, 1934, nationalists decided to launch an encirclement campaign to eliminate communist Shaanxi–Gansu Soviet by deploying troops from various units, with the nationalist 86th Division being the principle fighting unit.  Majority of the nationalist troops totaling over ten thousands would be deployed to attack the communist base in the border region of Shaanxi and Gansu provinces, while the bulk of the nationalist 86th Division would attack the other communist base of Shaanxi–Gansu Soviet in northern Shaanxi with the help of nationalist security regiment by taking regions including Stability (Anding, 安定), Yanchuan (延川), Suide (绥德), Clear Ravine (Qingjian, 清涧), Jia (葭) county, Wubao (Wubao, 吴堡), Celestial Wood (Shenmu, 神木) and Prefecture Valley (Fugu, 府谷).  Communists, in turn, decided to counter the nationalist encirclement campaign and defend their bases of the Shaanxi–Gansu Soviet.

Order of battle
Nationalists (12,500+ total)
2 regiments of the 2nd Regiment of the Garrison 2nd Cavalry Brigade of the 17th Route Army stationed in eastern Gansu
2 regiments of Shaanxi Garrison Cavalry Brigade stationed at Jingbian (靖边), Dingbian (定边), and Anbian (安边) regions
A regiment of the nationalist 42nd Division stationed at Wealthy (Fu, 富) County
Nationalist 86th Division stationed at Yan'an
Shaanxi Guerrilla Regiment
2 Security Regiments
Communists (7,000+ total)
42nd Division of the 26th Army
Guerrillas

Shaanxi–Gansu border region
In March, 1934, the communist 42nd Division and guerrilla under the command of Liu Zhidan (刘志丹) left the Southern Ridge (Nanliang 南梁) region and went northward behind the enemy line, and reached Triple River (Sandaochuan, 三道川) region of Wuqi (吴起) County, directly behind the 2nd Regiment of the Eastern Gansu 2nd Garrison Brigade of the nationalist 17th Route Army.  The communists subsequently launched their assaults on the unsuspecting nationalist regiment and after a series battles fought in the regions of Lan Family's Stone Probe (Lanjiabian, 蔺家砭) and Li Family's Ridge (Lijialiang, 李家梁), the surprised nationalists lost four companies and the nationalist security regiment was also badly mauled.  Before the nationalists could regroup and avenge their defeat, the communists quickly turned south to disengage and seek new opportunities.

The communists did not need to wait long for another opportunity.  On 11 April 1934, the communist 42nd Division annihilated the 5th Regiment of the nationalist Eastern Gansu 2nd Garrison Brigade, killing over 700 nationalist troops in the region of Xihuachi (西华池).  In early May, 1935, communists completely annihilated two companies of the nationalist Shaanxi Guerrilla Regiment in the region of Three Miles Source (Sanliyuan, 三里源) of Chunhua (淳化) County, and the nationalists were forced to deploy eight regiments for another round of offensives after suffering a series of defeats.  The communists decided not to engage the superior enemy force and returned to the Southern Ridge (Nanliang 南梁) region in the north to wait for other opportunities to annihilate their nationalist adversary.

In June, 1934, a detachment of communist 42nd Division went northward to Bao'an (Shaanxi), and defeated a battalion of the 514th Regiment of the nationalist 86th Division, killing more than a hundred nationalist troops in the process in the region of Horse River (Mazichuan, 马子川).  After this engagement, the nationalists gave up their attempt to eliminate the communist base in the border region of Shaanxi–Gansu and concede their defeat.  The communist 42nd Division and guerrillas fought over thirty battles and annihilated over three thousand nationalist troops and successfully secured their base in the region.

Northern Shaanxi
While the battles were raging on in the border region of Shaanxi and Gansu provinces in the south, in northern Shaanxi, local communist guerrillas under the command of Xie Zichang (谢子长), the communist Shaanxi military envoy and commander-in-chief of guerrilla in Shaanxi shocked the nationalists by taking the town of Stability (Anding, 安定) on 17 July 1934 and then linked up with the communist 42nd Division went south, with Xie Zichang (谢子长) became the political commissar of the communist 42nd Division.  The taking of the town by the poorly equipped communist guerrilla caused the nationalists to redeploy their troops to take back the town, thus opening the way for the communists to escape by removing nationalist troops originally stationed along the way.

Taking the opportunity, the communists withdrew northward, with Xie Zichang (谢子长) leading the communist guerrillas and 3rd Regiment of the communist 42nd Division.  On 15 August 1934, the communists once again was in Anding (安定) region, and begun to launch their assaults on the nationalists.  From 18 August 1934 thru 26 August 1934, three battles were fought in the regions of Jingwujiata (井吴家塌) of Stability (Anding, 安定) County, Zhang Family's Earth Platform (Zhangjiaketai, 张家圪台) of Clear Ravine (Qingjian, 清涧) County, and River Mouth (Hekou 河口) Town, and communists scored victory for all of them, completely annihilating two companies of the 515th Regiment of the nationalist 86th Division and badly mauling the nationalist security regiment in the battles.  Meanwhile, a battalion of the 514th Regiment of the nationalist 86th Division was also badly mauled by the communists in the regions of Celestial Wood (Shenmu, 神木) and Prefecture Valley (Fugu, 府谷).  After suffering a continuous series of defeat, the nationalists were forced to withdraw and called off their first encirclement campaign against Shaanxi–Gansu Soviet, and the communists declared their victory.

See also
List of battles of the Chinese Civil War
National Revolutionary Army
History of the People's Liberation Army
Chinese Civil War

Conflicts in 1934
Shaanxi-Gansu, encirclement campaign, 1st
1934 in China
Military history of Shaanxi
Military history of Gansu